Nikki Ann Sanderson (born 28 March 1984) is an English actress and former glamour model who is known for playing Candice Stowe in the television soap opera Coronation Street, Dawn Bellamy in Heartbeat and Maxine Minniver in Hollyoaks. During her time at Coronation Street and since, she has also been a television presenter on programmes such as CD:UK, Junior Eurovision: The British Final and Ministry of Mayhem.

Career
Sanderson was born in Blackpool, Lancashire and joined Coronation Street in 1999. She left in autumn 2005, when her character left Weatherfield to become a stylist for Status Quo. Prior to this, she had appeared in children's drama Children's Ward and in 2004, the hit fitness DVD Coronation Street: Funk Fit.

Since leaving Coronation Street she has appeared in episodes of the BBC television series' Holby City and New Street Law alongside fellow Coronation Street alumni Chris Gascoyne and Chris Bisson. In 2006, Sanderson appeared in a touring production of The Vagina Monologues with Jerry Hall amongst others and an episode of Kay Mellor's Strictly Confidential.

A keen singer, and karaoke enthusiast, Sanderson has made several television appearances singing, such as ITV's Madonna Mania, Discomania, Abba Mania 2 and Celebrity Stars in Their Eyes, where her impression of LeAnn Rimes, singing the theme from the film Coyote Ugly, Can't Fight the Moonlight earned her the winner's spot. She has also appeared on The X Factor: Battle of the Stars in the solo 16–24 category, mentored by Sharon Osbourne where she was eliminated fifth. At the time, though, Sanderson was suffering from tonsillitis and was straining her voice to sing.

For 2006 and 2007, she was signed by sports fashion footwear brand KangaROOS for their new print advertising campaign.

In June 2007, it was reported that Sanderson would make a brief return to Coronation Street in autumn 2007, when her character, Candice Stowe, turns up during the build up to Sarah Platt's (Tina O'Brien) wedding. However these reports were later dismissed by Sanderson during an appearance on ITV's Loose Women.

She appeared in the "Tuareg Productions" play Living Under One Roof at the Theatre Royal, Nottingham from 26–30 June 2007.

Sanderson appeared in the second series of All Star Family Fortunes which aired on 25 December 2007. She made a second appearance on the first edition of the quiz's fourth series, on 20 September 2009, as part of a team representing Heartbeat. 

In 2008, she joined the cast of the ITV1 series, Heartbeat, set in the 1960s, to play the part of Dawn Bellamy. She plays the part of Audrey in the horror film Boogeyman 3 released in 2009. She plays the character Gee Gee, a dance teacher, in the 2008 film Clubbed, an underworld drama set in the early 1980s.

Sanderson featured in the 2010 UK tour of The Vagina Monologues.

In September 2012, it was announced that Sanderson had joined the cast of Hollyoaks as Maxine Minniver. Sanderson's first episode was aired on 5 November 2012.

In December 2012, Sanderson appeared in pantomime as Peter Pan at the Gracie Fields Theatre in Rochdale.

In late 2013, Sanderson, along with her Hollyoaks co-star and on-screen boyfriend Jeremy Sheffield, appeared in character as their Hollyoaks characters Maxine and Patrick in a series of government "This is Abuse" adverts, highlighting the issues of domestic violence.

For her portrayal of Maxine, Sanderson received nominations for the "Best Actress" award at the British Soap Awards 2014 and 2015. She was also nominated for "Beat Serial Performance" at the National Television Awards 2015.

Personal life
Nikki Ann Sanderson was born on 28 March 1984 in Blackpool, England. Sanderson dated her former Coronation Street co-star Danny Young from 2005 to February 2009.

Filmography

Awards and nominations

References

External links

1984 births
Living people
English child actresses
English film actresses
English stage actresses
English television actresses
People from Blackpool
The X Factor (British TV series) contestants
English soap opera actresses